Bonnie Lynn Hunt (born September 22, 1961) is an American actress, comedian, director, producer, writer and television host. Her film roles include Rain Man, Beethoven, Beethoven's 2nd, Jumanji, Jerry Maguire, The Green Mile, Cheaper by the Dozen, and Cheaper by the Dozen 2.

Hunt has done voice work in A Bug's Life, Zootopia, and the Monsters, Inc., Cars, and Toy Story franchises. She starred in Grand and Davis Rules, as well as creating, producing, writing, and starring in The Building, Bonnie, and Life with Bonnie. From 2008 to 2010, she hosted The Bonnie Hunt Show.

Early life
Bonnie Lynn Hunt was born on September 22, 1961, in Chicago, to Robert Edward Hunt, an electrician, and Alice E. Hunt (née Jatczak), a homemaker. Her father was of Irish and Belgian ancestry and her mother is of Polish descent. She has three older brothers named Patrick, Kevin, and Tom, two older sisters named Cathy and Carol, and a younger sister named Mary.
She was educated in Catholic schools, attending St. Ferdinand Grammar School and Notre Dame High School for Girls in Chicago, and worked part-time as a nurse's aide.

In 1982, Hunt worked as an oncology nurse at Northwestern Memorial Hospital in Chicago. In 1984, she co-founded an improvisational comedy troupe called An Impulsive Thing.  Hunt also performed as a member of Chicago's world-famous the Second City, joining in 1986.

In 1988, while a nurse, Hunt auditioned on her lunch break for the role of waitress Sally Dibbs in Rain Man and won it.

Career
In 1990, Hunt portrayed Carol Anne Smithson in Grand. She refused to become a cast member of Saturday Night Live because the series' producers generally frowned on her preferred improvisational style. In 1992, she was offered the part of B. J. Poteet, a replacement for Julia Duffy, on Designing Women. Instead, she chose to co-star in Davis Rules.

In 1993, Hunt teamed with good friend David Letterman to produce The Building. The series was also filmed live; mistakes, accidents, and forgotten lines were often left in the aired episode. In 1995, Hunt and Letterman reteamed for The Bonnie Hunt Show (later retitled Bonnie), which featured many of the same cast members as The Building and the same loose style. The show was praised by critics but was canceled after 11 of the 13 episodes produced were aired. In 2002, Hunt returned to television with Life with Bonnie. Her role on the series earned her a 2004 Emmy nomination (which was her first). Despite fair ratings, the series was canceled in its second season. Hunt announced on Live with Regis and Kelly that ABC had offered her another sitcom, in which she would have portrayed a divorced detective. This pilot titled Let Go (also known as Crimes and Dating) was not picked up for the fall 2006 schedule.

She directed, co-wrote, and co-starred in Return to Me. It was filmed in her Chicago neighborhood and included bit parts for a number of her relatives. The film, which received a positive reception from critics, was largely influenced by Hunt's blue-collar Catholic upbringing in Chicago.

Hunt portrayed Alice Newton in Beethoven and Beethoven's 2nd, Sarah Whittle/Madam Serena in Jumanji, and Kate Baker in Cheaper by the Dozen and Cheaper by the Dozen 2. She portrayed the sister of Renée Zellweger's character in Jerry Maguire and Jan Edgecomb in The Green Mile. She portrayed Grace Bellamy in Loggerheads. She has provided her voice for a total of eight Pixar films: A Bug's Life as Rosie, Monsters, Inc. as Ms. Flint, Cars, Cars 2, and Cars 3 as Sally Carrera, Toy Story 3 and Toy Story 4 as Dolly, and Monsters University as Karen Graves. In addition, Hunt voiced Bonnie Hopps in the Walt Disney Animation Studios' film, Zootopia, which marked her first non-Pixar animated film.

The Bonnie Hunt Show

In 2007, Hunt taped a pilot episode for Telepictures. The pilot was approved and the talk show was created. The Bonnie Hunt Show premiered on Monday, September 8, 2008. The set design was a tribute to Dean Martin and on the walls are pictures of historic television personalities, as well as Hunt's family members. The series was inspired by the format of Live with Regis and Kelly, with the host and guests often interacting with the audience. Many of the series' staffers were longtime friends of Hunt's from Chicago. The series typically started with an opening monologue followed by guest interviews and games played with the audience. Hunt's mother Alice often appeared in webcasts from her home in Chicago. The Bonnie Hunt Show taped in Culver City, California, and was viewed in 17 of the top 20 US television markets in the United States. In its first year, The Bonnie Hunt Show was nominated for three Daytime Emmy Awards, for opening theme, hairstyle, and makeup. It won the Gracie Award for "Outstanding Talk Show" in 2009. In 2010, Hunt was nominated for "Outstanding Talk Show Host" at the Daytime Emmy Awards. The final episode aired on May 26, 2010.

Personal life
In 1988, Hunt married investment banker John Murphy. During her appearance on the Late Show with David Letterman on June 6, 2006, she mentioned that she was single again, implying that she and Murphy had divorced.

Hunt is a lifelong Chicago Cubs fan, having not missed an opening day at Wrigley Field since 1977. She was in attendance in Cleveland, along with fellow Cubs fans Eddie Vedder, Bill Murray and John Cusack, for the Cubs' historic Game 7 victory during the 2016 World Series.

She is a supporter of the Multiple Myeloma Research Foundation, of which she is an honorary board member.

Filmography

Film

Television

Video games

Theme park attractions

Awards and nominations

References

External links

 
 

1961 births
Living people
20th-century American actresses
20th-century American comedians
21st-century American actresses
21st-century American comedians
Actresses from Chicago
American film actresses
American nurses
American people of Belgian descent
American people of Irish descent
American people of Polish descent
American television actresses
American television directors
American television talk show hosts
American television writers
American video game actresses
American voice actresses
American women comedians
American women nurses
American women screenwriters
American women television directors
American women television producers
American women television writers
Catholics from Illinois
Comedians from Illinois
Pixar people
Television producers from Illinois
Writers from Chicago